The Apostolic Nunciature to Azerbaijan is an ecclesiastical office of the Catholic Church in Azerbaijan. It is headed by the Apostolic Nuncio, a member of the diplomatic service of the Holy See, who represents the interests of the Holy See to Church officials, the government, and civil society in Azerbaijan. It is a diplomatic post with the rank of ambassador.

Azerbaijan and the Holy See established diplomatic relations on 23 May 1992.

Papal representatives to Azerbaijan 
Jean-Paul Gobel (15 January 1994 – 6 December 1997)
Peter Stephan Zurbriggen (13 June 1998 – 25 October 2001)
Claudio Gugerotti (13 December 2001 – 15 July 2011)
Marek Solczyński (14 April 2012 – 25 April 2017)
Paul Fitzpatrick Russell (7 April 2018 – 14 February 2022)
Marek Solczyński (14 February 2022 – present)

References

Azerbaijan